Pierre Mornand (1884-1972) was a French writer and bibliophile. He was the editor-in-chief of Le Courrier graphique.

Selected publications
Trente Artistes du Livre. Éditions Marval, 1945.
Vingt-Deux Artistes du Livre. Le Courrier graphique, 1948.
Vingt Artistes du Livre. Le Courrier graphique, 1950.

References

1884 births
1972 deaths
French editors
French male non-fiction writers
20th-century French male writers